Peter Joseph Boettke (born January 3, 1960) is an American economist of the Austrian School. He is currently a professor of economics and philosophy at George Mason University; the BB&T Professor for the Study of Capitalism, vice president for research, and director of the F.A. Hayek Program for Advanced Study in Philosophy, Politics, and Economics at the Mercatus Center at GMU.

Early life and education
Boettke was born and raised in Rahway, New Jersey, to Fred and Elinor Boettke. In high school and college, he played for the school basketball and tennis teams.

He attended Thiel College in Greenville, Pennsylvania and later Grove City College in nearby Grove City, Pennsylvania. At Grove City, he became interested in economics when he took a course taught by Hans Sennholz, and there he developed his religious convictions. After completing a B.A. (1983) in economics at Grove City, Boettke attended George Mason University where he earned an M.A. (1987) and a Ph.D. (1989) in economics. His thesis was The political economy of Soviet socialism, 1918–1928 under the supervision of Don Lavoie.

Career
After receiving his doctoral degree, Boettke taught at several institutions, including Oakland University, Manhattan College and New York University. In 1998, he returned to George Mason University as a faculty member. In 2004, he was named a Hayek Fellow at the London School of Economics. He has also been a Faculty Fellow at the Charles University/Georgetown University American Institute for Political and Economic Studies in Prague and a visiting scholar at the Hoover Institution on War, Revolution and Peace at Stanford University. He has also been made an affiliated member of the Philosophy Department at George Mason University and, in 2012, he was awarded a doctorate honoris causa in social sciences from Universidad Francisco Marroquín.

In addition to his academic positions, he is vice president for research at Mercatus Center and director of the F.A. Hayek Program for Advanced Study in Philosophy, Politics, and Economics. Until 2007, Boettke held the position of director of graduate studies for the Ph.D. program in economics at George Mason. He is the editor of George Mason University's Review of Austrian Economics and as vice president of the Mont Pelerin Society for the 2018–2020 term. He was the society's president from 2016 to 2018.

Other pursuits
Boettke worked as a tennis instructor before pursuing his graduate degree in economics. After graduate school, he began coaching youth basketball and eventually coached at the high school and elite AAU level, qualifying for the AAU 16U National Championships in 2007. Several of his players reached college-level competition. In 2009, he was inducted as a coach into the local basketball Hall of Fame in Northern Virginia.

Analytical anarchism 
Analytical anarchism is the name given by Boettke to the positive political economy of anarchism, or anarchism from the economic point of view, in the libertarian tradition of Murray Rothbard's For a New Liberty (1973) and David Friedman's The Machinery of Freedom (1973). Boettke claims that analytical anarchism has developed out of this tradition and is currently being pursued by economists such as Peter Leeson, Edward Stringham and Christopher Coyne. These professors are related to Mercatus Center and to the faculty of economics at George Mason University.

Publications
Books
 Living Economics: Yesterday, Today, and Tomorrow (Independent Institute and Universidad Francisco Marroquin 2012) .
 Context Matters: Institutions and Entrepreneurship (co-authored with Christopher Coyne (professor)) (Now Publishers, 2009) 
 The Battle of Ideas: Economics and the Struggle for a Better World
 Is an Independent Non-Profit Sector Prone to Failure? (co-authored with David Prychitko)
 The Political Economy of Soviet Socialism: The Formative Years, 1918–1928 (Kluwer, 1990) .
 Why Perestroika Failed: The Economics and Politics of Socialism Transformation (Routledge, 1993) .
 Calculation and Coordination: Essays on Socialism and Transitional Political Economy (Routledge, 2001) .
 The Economic Way of Thinking with Paul Heyne and David Prychitko (Pearson, 2014) .
 
Books as editor
 Market Process: Essays in Contemporary Austrian Economics with David Prychitko. Edward Elgar, 1994.
 The Collapse of Development Planning. New York University Press, 1994.
 The Elgar Companion to Austrian Economics. Elgar, 1994
 The Market Process, 2 volumes, with David Prychitko. Elgar, 1998
 The Legacy of F. A. Hayek: Politics, Philosophy, Economics, 3 volumes. Edward Elgar, 1999
 Socialism and the Market: The Socialist Calculation Debate Revisited, 9 volumes. Routledge, 2000.
 The Legacy of Ludwig von Mises: Theory and History, ed. with Peter Leeson. 2 vols. Aldershot: Edward Elgar, 2006. 
 The Economic Point of View, the first volume of Israel Kirzner's Collected Works, edited with Frederic Sautet and published by Liberty Fund, December 2009.
 Handbook On Contemporary Austrian Economics, Edward Elgar, 2010.
 Market Theory and the Price System, the second volume of Israel Kirzner's Collected Works, edited with Frederic Sautet and published by Liberty Fund, May 2011.
 Essays on Capital, the third volume of Israel Kirzner's Collected Works, edited with Frederic Sautet and published by Liberty Fund, 2012.
 The Oxford Handbook of Austrian Economics, with Christopher Coyne. October 2015.
 The Economic Role of the State (ed. with Peter Leeson). Cheltenham: Edward Elgar, 2015.

Personal life 

Boettke resides in Fairfax, Virginia, with his wife and two sons.

References

External links
 Boettke's Coordination Problem blog (with Christopher Coyne, Steve Horwitz, Peter Leeson, David Prychitko, and Frederic Sautet)
 Boettke's biography at the Mercatus Center
 Boettke's biography at the Institute for Humane Studies
 
 Liberty & Power Group blog
 
 "A Market Nobel", The Wall Street Journal op-ed, October 16, 2007
 

1960 births
Living people
American libertarians
Austrian School economists
George Mason University alumni
George Mason University faculty
Grove City College alumni
Manhattan College faculty
New York University faculty
Oakland University faculty
People from Rahway, New Jersey
Stanford University staff
Thiel College alumni
Mackinac Center for Public Policy
Mercatus Center
Economists from New Jersey
21st-century American economists
Member of the Mont Pelerin Society